The Reformed Congregations in North America form a denomination Continental Reformed, established in 1967 in United States and Canada, by dissidents from Netherlands Reformed Congregations.

The denomination has official ties with the Reformed Congregations in the Netherlands, and the churches are mainly in Canada. It has approximately 1747 members, three churches in Canada and one in the United States in 2012. The theology focus is mainly on the time of the Further reformation and subscribes to the Three Forms of Unity: The Heidelberg Catechism, The Belgic Confession of Faith, and the Canons of Dordt. The largest church is the congregation of Chilliwack with over 1,200 members.

History 

In Canada in Lethbridge and in Chilliwack congregations decided to cooperate. In 1967 the Chilliwack Congregation decided in its meeting to cooperate and join forces with the Reformed Congregations in the Netherlands. On June 28, 1968 the first classis meeting was held in Lethbridge, Alberta.

The Chilliwack Reformed Congregation's building was dedicated in 1969, it was several times enlarged and extended, recently in 2004 from 800 to 1,200 seats. From 2011 till 2018 the church was served by pastor Rev. A. Geuze. In late 2022, Rev. VanderTang was installed as new minister. The Lethbridge Congregation had a new building in 2008, with 325 seats.

In 2019 the fifth church of the denomination was opened in Giroux (Manitoba).

Churches

See also
Gereformeerde Gemeenten in Nederland

References 

Reformed denominations in Canada
Reformed denominations in the United States
Christian organizations established in 1967
Calvinist denominations established in the 20th century